The Ebbw River is a river in South Wales which gives its name to the town of Ebbw Vale. The Ebbw River is joined by the Ebbw Fach River (Welsh: Afon Ebwy Fach meaning 'little Ebbw river') at Aberbeeg. The Ebbw Fach is itself fed by a left-bank tributary, the River Tyleri.

The tributary Sirhowy River joins on the right bank at Crosskeys, then the river continues flowing south east, through the town of Risca, then through the western suburbs of Newport, alongside Tredegar Park. The tidal Ebbw joins with the estuarine River Usk seaward of Newport, before flowing into the Mouth of the Severn.

In common with the nearby Sirhowy River and Rhymney River the correct English name for the river is "Ebbw River", not the more usual "River Ebbw".

References

External links 
 A picture of the Ebbw River
 www.geograph.co.uk : photos of the Ebbw River and surrounding area & here

Rivers of Blaenau Gwent
Rivers of the Brecon Beacons National Park
Rivers of Caerphilly County Borough
Rivers of Newport, Wales
Rivers of Powys
Ebbw Vale